The 2015 UCI Africa Tour was the 11th season of the UCI Africa Tour. The season began on 14 January with the Tour d'Egypte and ended on 20 December with the GP de Youssoufia.

The points leader, based on the cumulative results of previous races, wears the UCI Africa Tour cycling jersey. Mekseb Debesay of Eritrea is the defending champion of the 2013–14 UCI Africa Tour.

Throughout the season, points are awarded to the top finishers of stages within stage races and the final general classification standings of each of the stages races and one-day events. The quality and complexity of a race also determines how many points are awarded to the top finishers, the higher the UCI rating of a race, the more points are awarded.
The UCI ratings from highest to lowest are as follows:
 Multi-day events: 2.HC, 2.1 and 2.2
 One-day events: 1.HC, 1.1 and 1.2

Events

Standings
Final Standings

External links
 

UCI Africa Tour
2015 UCI Africa Tour
UCI Africa Tour